Bruggisser is a surname. Notable people with the surname include:

Phillip Bruggisser (born 1991), Danish ice hockey player
Philippe Bruggisser (born 1948), Swiss chief executive